Eucrostes disparata is a moth of the family Geometridae first described by Francis Walker in 1861. It is found in Sri Lanka, Ethiopia, Taiwan, Japan and Australia.

The wingspan of the adult is 15 mm. The adult has greenish wings with a broad brown margin. There are two white submarginal lines. A distinct red dot is found in the middle of each hindwing and a faint red dot in each forewing.

References

External links
Emerald Moth (Eucrostes disparata)

Moths of Asia
Moths described in 1861